is a Japanese manga author. As of 2018 her latest series, Sakura no Hana no Kōcha Ōji (Tea Prince of Cherry Blossoms) is being serialized in Bessatsu Hana to Yume.

Works
 Kumiko & Shingo Series (1990–1997, 15 volumes)
 Kōcha Ōji (1997–2004, 25 volumes)
 Kōcha Ōji no Himegimi (2006, 1 volume)
 Otona no Kodomotachi: Kumiko & Shingo Series Special (2002–2007, 1 volume)
 Manabiya Sannin Kichisa (2004–2006, 4 volumes)
 Skyblue Shore (Sorairo Kaigan) (2006–2008, 6 volumes) - first two volumes were released in English by Tokyopop
 Orange Chocolate (2009-2014, 13 volumes)
 Sakura no Hana no Kōcha Ōji (2013-, 11 Volumes (Ongoing))

References

External links
Knowledge of Nanpei Yamada  (Fan site)
Comicate Interview No. 52 – Nanpei Yamada

1972 births
Female comics writers
Japanese women writers
Living people
Women manga artists
Manga artists from Kanagawa Prefecture
Japanese female comics artists